This is a list of winners and nominees of the Primetime Emmy Award for Outstanding Character Voice-Over Performance.

In 2014, the award for Outstanding Voice-Over Performance was separated into two categories – Outstanding Narrator and Outstanding Character Voice-Over Performance. As with longform and reality, this split acknowledges and accommodates a general industry uptrend in the distinctly different achievements that are VO narration and VO character performance.

Winners and nominations

2010s

2020s

Performers with multiple wins
Totals include wins for Outstanding Voice-Over Performance.

4 wins
 Hank Azaria
 Dan Castellaneta
 Seth MacFarlane

2 wins

 Ja'net Dubois
 Maurice LaMarche
 Maya Rudolph

Performers with multiple nominations
Totals include nominations for Outstanding Voice-Over Performance.

11 nominations
 Seth MacFarlane

9 nominations
 Hank Azaria

8 nominations
 Dan Castellaneta

6 nominations
 Seth Green

3 nominations
 Alex Borstein
 Nancy Cartwright
 Maurice LaMarche
 Maya Rudolph

2 nominations
 Julie Andrews
 Bob Bergen
 Ja'net Dubois
 Harry Shearer
 Stanley Tucci
 Jessica Walter

References

Character Voice-Over Performance
Voice acting awards